Hopeall Bay (also Hope-all Bay) is a natural bay off the island of Newfoundland in the province of Newfoundland and Labrador, Canada. It is an arm of Trinity Bay which in turn opens to the Atlantic Ocean.

References

Bays of Newfoundland and Labrador